Do Boneh or Dowbaneh or Do Baneh or Dowbeneh may refer to:
 Dowbaneh, Fars
 Do Boneh, Kerman